Erythrina euodiphylla is a species of legume in the family Fabaceae. It is found only in Indonesia.

References

Sources

euodiphylla
Trees of Java
Flora of the Lesser Sunda Islands
Vulnerable plants
Taxonomy articles created by Polbot